Christopher Lane Noxon (born November 21, 1968) is an American writer and freelance journalist.

Early life 
Noxon was born in Los Angeles, California, to National Geographic documentary filmmaker father, Nicolas Noxon, and Mary Straley. His grandmother was painter Betty Lane.

Career 
Noxon began his career at the Los Angeles Daily News. His assignments have included the Democratic National Convention for Reuters and a Playboy feature about drug rehab. Noxon has also written for Los Angeles magazine, The Huffington Post and Salon.com, as well as working as a music consultant on the Showtime series Weeds.

His first book was Rejuvenile. The book, which grew out of a story he wrote for The New York Times, was reviewed in BusinessWeek, The New York Sun and covered by The Today Show, Good Morning America and NPR. Noxon appeared on Bill Maher's "Fishbowl" and Comedy Central's  "The Colbert Report".

Personal life 
In 1997, Noxon married television writer Jenji Kohan, and is the brother of writer Marti Noxon. Kohan and Noxon had three children : a son Charlie (who passed away in 2019), a daughter Eliza, and youngest son Oscar. They live in the Los Feliz section of Los Angeles, California.  He is a convert to Judaism. Kohan and her family are Jewish; they belong to two synagogues and a chavurah group, and her children attend Jewish day school and summer camp. Every Friday, Kohan and her extended family have Shabbat dinner together.

Noxon is credited on Weeds extensively. Noxon's book Rejuvenile appears frequently in Weeds. The character Andy Botwin is seen reading Rejuvenile in season 2 episode, "Corn Snake". The character Dean Hodes is reading it in bed in episode 10 of Season 2, "Mile Deep and A Foot Wide", and the book is on display during Nancy Botwin's shopping spree in episode 8 of Season 2, "MILF Money". The character Heylia James is reading the book at the grow house in episode 14 of Season 3, "Protection".

Works and publications 
 Noxon, Christopher. "I don't want to grow up!" Miller, D. Quentin. The Generation of Ideas: A Thematic Reader. Boston, Mass: Thomson/Wadsworth, 2005.  
 Noxon, Christopher. Rejuvenile Kickball, Cartoons, Cupcakes, and the Reinvention of the American Grown-Up. New York: Crown Publishers, 2006.  
 Noxon, Christopher. Plus One: A Novel. Altadena, California: Prospect Park Books, 2015.

References

External links
 Christopher Noxon
 Rejuvenile
 Christopher Noxon at The Huffington Post

1968 births
American male journalists
Living people
Converts to Judaism
Writers from Los Angeles
Journalists from California
People from Los Feliz, Los Angeles